Lochiel Farm is a historic home located in West Whiteland Township, Chester County, Pennsylvania. The house was built about 1800.  It consists of a large, two-story, double pile stone central section with two flanking wings in the Georgian / Federal style.

It was listed on the National Register of Historic Places in 1984.

References

Houses on the National Register of Historic Places in Pennsylvania
Georgian architecture in Pennsylvania
Federal architecture in Pennsylvania
Houses completed in 1800
Houses in Chester County, Pennsylvania
National Register of Historic Places in Chester County, Pennsylvania